Finish Line, Inc. is an American retail chain that sells athletic shoes and related apparel and accessories owned by JD Sports. The company operates 660 stores in 47 states and Puerto Rico, mostly in shopping malls, as well as Finish Line-branded athletic shoe departments in more than 450 Macy's stores. On June 18, 2018, the company was acquired by multinational retailer JD Sports after the completion of its merger at a price of $13.50 per share in cash.

References

Companies based in Indianapolis
Shoe companies of the United States
Sporting goods retailers of the United States
Companies formerly listed on the Nasdaq
Retail companies established in 1976
2018 mergers and acquisitions
American subsidiaries of foreign companies
Footwear retailers of the United States